Orange is a city in the Central Tablelands region of New South Wales, Australia. Orange had an estimated urban population of 40,493 as of June 2018 making the city a significant regional centre. Orange is situated within the traditional lands of the Wiradjuri Nation.

Orange is the birthplace of poets Banjo Paterson and Kenneth Slessor, although Paterson lived in Orange for only a short time as an infant. Walter W. Stone, book publisher (Wentworth Books) and passionate supporter of Australian literature, was also born in Orange. The first Australian Touring Car Championship, known today as V8 Supercar Championship Series, was held at the Gnoo Blas Motor Racing Circuit in 1960.

History

The Orange region is the traditional land of the Wiradjuri people. Known as the people of the three rivers, the Wiradjuri people have inhabited New South Wales for at least 60,000 years.

In 1822 Captain Percy Simpson arrived in the Wellington District and established a convict settlement which was called "Blackman's Swamp" after James Blackman; Simpson had employed James Blackman as a guide because he had already accompanied an earlier explorer, John Oxley into that region.

In the late 1820s, the surveyor J. B. Richards worked on a survey of the Macquarie River below Bathurst and also of the road to Wellington. On a plan dated 1829, he indicated a village reserve, in the parish of Orange. Sir Thomas Mitchell named the parish Orange, as he had been an associate of the Prince of Orange in the Peninsular War, when both were aides-de-camp to the Duke of Wellington, whose title was bestowed on the valley to the west by Oxley.

Initial occupation by graziers began in late 1829, and tiny settlements eventually turned into larger towns as properties came into connection with the road. In 1844, the surveyor Davidson was sent to check on encroachments onto the land reserved for a village, and to advise on the location for a township. His choices were Frederick's Valley, Pretty Plains, or Blackman's Swamp.

Blackman's Swamp was chosen, and it was proclaimed a village and named Orange by Major Thomas Mitchell in 1846 in honour of Prince William of Orange. At nearby Ophir, a significant gold find in Australia was made in 1851, resulting in a sporadic population movement which is known as the Australian gold rush. Additional gold finds in nearby areas led to the establishment of Orange as a central trading centre for the gold.

The growth of Orange continued as the conditions were well suited for agriculture, and in 1860 it was proclaimed a municipality. The railway from Sydney reached Orange in 1877. In 1946, 100 years after it was first being established as a village, Orange was proclaimed as a minor city.

Orange was proposed as a site for Australia's national capital city, prior to the selection of Canberra. The new capital city would have adjoined the town of Orange, which would have been included in the surrounding federal territory.

Population

According to the 2016 census of Population, there were 37,182 people in the Orange urban centre.
 Aboriginal and Torres Strait Islander people made up 6.6% of the population.
 83.2% of people were born in Australia. The next most common countries of birth were England 1.6%, India 1.0%, New Zealand 0.9%, Philippines 0.5% and China 0.4%.
 87.3% of people only spoke English at home. Other languages spoken at home included Malayalam 0.7%, Mandarin 0.4%, Italian 0.3% and Nepali 0.3%.
 The most common responses for religion were Catholic 30.1%, No Religion 22.0% and Anglican 20.2%.
 Of the employed people in Orange (Urban Centres and Localities), 6.2% worked in hospitals (except psychiatric hospitals). Other major industries of employment included gold ore mining 4.2%, state government administration 3.4%, other social assistance services 3.2% and supermarket and grocery stores 2.5%.

Geography and climate

Owing to its altitude, Orange has a temperate oceanic climate (Köppen Cfb), with warm summers (though with cool mornings) and cold, wet winters with frequent morning frosts. The city is relatively wet for an inland location owing to orographic effects from Mount Canobolas, especially during the cooler months when snow falls; Orange is one of the few major regional cities in Australia to receive annual snowfall (that is, guaranteed snow every year), although far from a regular occurrence on account of its northern latitude. Due to its windward position on the western side of the ranges, Orange experiences significantly wetter winters than the cities in the east, namely Lithgow and Bathurst.

Compared with most population centres in Australia it has colder winters, especially in terms of its daytime maximum temperatures, owing to its westerly exposure. In summer, the average (and absolute) maximum temperatures are also lower than in most inland centres, on account of its elevation. Owing to its inland location, the humidity is low in the summer months with the dewpoint typically around 10 °C. Having 99.8 clear days annually, it is still cloudier than the coastal areas of Sydney and Wollongong (104 and 107 clear days, respectively), with a marked lack of sunshine in winter compared to summer.

The climate has enabled the area to be a major apple and pear producer, and a centre for cool-weather wine production.

Economy

Orange is a well-known fruit growing district, and produces apples, pears, and many stone fruits such as cherries, peaches, apricots, and plums; oranges are not grown in the area, since its climate is too cool. In recent years, a large number of vineyards have been planted in the area for rapidly expanding wine production. The growth of this wine industry, coupled with the further development of Orange as a gourmet food capital, has ensured Orange's status as a prominent tourism destination.

Other large industries include:
 Cadia gold mine is a large open cut gold and copper mine located about 20 kilometres south of Orange. The mine has been developed throughout the 1990s and is a major employer in the region with an expected lifespan of several decades. Cadia is the second largest open-cut mine in Australia, following the Super Pit at Kalgoorlie, Western Australia. Large mineral deposits are also being uncovered from the more recently developed Ridgeway underground mine which is adjacent to the Cadia Mine.
An Electrolux white goods factory, closed in 2017.
Orange is also the location of the headquarters of the New South Wales Department of Industry (Department of Industry, Skills and Regional Development, the New South Wales Department of Primary Industries).

Education

Primary and public schools 

 St Mary's Catholic Primary School
 Orange Public, opened 1880
 Orange East Public
 Calare Public School
 Orange Christian School
 Kinross Wolaroi School
 Bletchington Primary School
 Anson Street Public School
 Glenroi Heights Public School
 Bowen Public School
 Canobolas Public School
 Clergate Public School
 Catherine McAuley Catholic
 Orange Anglican Grammar School

The following primary schools are not within the city limits of Orange but are located within the rural fringe of Orange:

 Spring Hill Public School
 Nashdale Primary School
 Spring Terrace Public School
 Borenore Public School
 Clergate Public School
 Borenore Public School
 Mullion Creek Public School

Secondary schools

 Orange High School
 James Sheahan Catholic High School
 Canobolas Rural Technology High School
Orange Christian School (K–12)
 Kinross Wolaroi School (Prep–12)
 Orange Anglican Grammar School (Transition 4yrs – 12)
MET School Orange Campus (3–12)
De La Salle College (defunct)

Tertiary education

A campus of Charles Sturt University is located on the outskirts of northern Orange.
A large campus of TAFE is also located in Orange.
Orange Regional Conservatorium

Churches

St Joseph's and St Mary's Catholic Churches
Holy Trinity Anglican Church
Orange Uniting Churches
 Orange Baptist Church
 Orange Presbyterian Church
 St Peter's Lutheran Church
New Life City Church
Orange Evangelical Church
Orange Christian Assembly
Mountain Hope Church
 Salvation Army
 Orange Seventh-day Adventist Church
 Orange Church of Christ
 Slavic Pentecostal Church
  The Church of Jesus Christ of Latter-Day Saints
  Open Heavens Church

Suburbs and Localities

The following are listed as the suburbs within Orange City Council, according to the New South Wales Division of Local Government:

Ammerdown: a residential locality to the north west of Orange on the Mitchell Highway.
Bletchington: containing mostly residential areas with one school, it is one of the largest residential areas, and it is often split into North Orange and Bletchington. Within the suburb are the Orange Botanic Gardens, the Orange Adventure Playground, and the Waratah Sports Ground.
Bloomfield: containing farmland, Bloomfield Golf Course, Riverside Mental Institution and Orange Health Service (a major regional hospital) along with the Gosling Creek Reservoir and the Gosling Creek nature reserve.
Also the site of the Australian National Field Days.
Bowen: containing residential, predominantly public housing, industrial, commercial, Kinross Woloroi School, and government offices, this suburb also has the main road out of Orange to Sydney. It also contains the Orange Showground and the Orange Cemetery.
Calare: the suburb is located to the west of the CBD. It is mostly a residential area, and contains Calare Public School and Orange High School, and Wentworth Golf Course. It is also commonly split into Calare, Bel-Air and Wentworth Estate and has The Quarry and Towac Park Racecourse. It houses most New Areas of Orange
Canobolas: this mainly farming and recreation area, contains the Mount Canobolas State recreation area and Mount Canobolas.
Clifton Grove: containing farmland and large residential blocks, some parts of the estate are down stream from the Suma Park Reservoir and the area also contains the Kinross State Forest.
Clover Hill: a residential suburb to the north of the CBD.
Glenroi: a mainly residential area with areas of public housing, along with the Electrolux white goods manufacturing plant. It also contains industrial land in areas surrounding the factory, as well as a more recent industrial area known as Leewood Estate.
Huntley: a locality south of Orange.
It is a historic mining town with small residential, small industrial and commercial with most being farmland.
March: a locality north of Orange.
 Millthorpe: a village south east of Orange. The area constituting a suburb of Orange is constituted of farmland lying to the northwest of the village.
Narrambla: a mainly industrial and farming land area.
 Nashdale:a community located approximately 8 kilometres west of Orange. The community gathers around the local Nashdale Public School and hall. 
Orange: the suburb comprises the central business district of the city, which contains an original grid street plan. The main street of Orange is Summer Street. The CBD can be defined as being the area of the city bounded by Hill, March, Peisley, and Moulder Streets.
Orange East: beginning on the eastern side of the railway line, Orange East is mostly residential, but contains some light businesses, especially on Summer, Byng, and William Streets.
Orange South: directly to the south of the CBD, beginning past Moulder Street this area contains Wade Park and the Orange Base Hospital.
Shadforth: a locality to the east of Orange bypassed by the Mitchell Highway that contains Shadforth Quarry.
 Spring Hill: a village to the southeast of Orange.
Spring Terrace: a locality and small village located south of Orange, centred on the local primary school.
Springside: a rural locality to the south of Orange.
Suma Park: a lightly populated residential area on the eastern outskirts of Orange. It contains Suma Park Reservoir, Orange's main water supply.
Summer Hill: a lightly populated residential, industrial, and farmland area on the south eastern outskirts of Orange on the Mitchell Highway.
Warrendine: a mostly residential area and contains James Sheahan Catholic High School and industrial land. It also has small school farmland and Jack Brabham Park.

Mining
Cadia-Ridgeway Mine is a large open cut gold and copper mine located about 20 kilometres south of Orange, the mine has been developed throughout the 1990s employing several thousand employees with an expected lifespan of several decades. Cadia is the second largest open cut mine in Australia after the Super Pit at Kalgoorlie. Large mineral deposits are also being uncovered from the more recently developed Ridgeway underground mine which is adjacent to the Cadia Mine.

Winemaking

The Orange wine region is defined as the area above 600m in the local government areas of Orange, Cabonne and Blayney and can be usefully described as a circle around Orange. The Orange region is good for grape growing and winemaking due to a combination of geology, soils, climate and temperature. Together these factors combine to produce grapes and wine of distinct flavours and colour. The climate perhaps plays the biggest part in giving Orange some distinct natural advantages – the cool temperatures during most of the growing season coupled with dry autumn conditions are ideal for grape growing.

Wineries

 Amour Wines
 Angullong Wines
 Atallah Wines
 Bloodwood
 Boree Lane
 Borrodell on the Mount
 Brangayne of Orange
 Canobolas Smith
 Cargo Road Winery
 Cooks Lot

 Colmar Estate
 Cumulus Estate
 Dindima
 De Salis
 Faisan Estate
 Habitat Vineyard
 Heifer Station Vineyard
 Highland Heritage
 Hoosegg Wines

 Mayfield Vineyard
 Montoro Wines
 Mortimer's Wines
 Nashdale Lane
 Orange Mountain Wines
 Patina
 Philip Shaw
 Printhie / Swift
 Ross Hill
 Rowlee Wines
 Rikard Wines

 Sassy Wines
 Sea Saw Wines
 Slow Wine Co.
 Strawhouse Wines
 Stockman's Ridge
 Swinging Bridge
 Tallwood Wines
 Tamburlaine Wines
 Word of Mouth Wines

Wineries that use Orange region grapes in their wines include Brokenwood Wines (Hunter Valley based), Logan (Mudgee), Tamburlaine (Hunter Valley), Gartelmann (Hunter Valley), Windowrie (Central Ranges), Eloquesta Wines (Mudgee) and Lowe Wines (Mudgee).  In 2007, South Australian based Penfolds winery released the 2007 Penfolds Bin 311 Orange Region Chardonnay.

Media
Orange is served by several radio stations, including 105.1 Triple M Central West 2GZFM, 105.9 Hit Central West, FM107.5 Orange Community Radio, 103.5 Rhema FM, One Central West FM88 and 2EL 1089AM – a commercial station that gets most of its programming from 2SM in Sydney. The Australian Broadcasting Corporation (ABC) also broadcasts from four radio stations in Orange including ABC Local Radio (2CR) on 549AM and three national networks – ABC Classic FM on 102.7 FM, ABC Radio National on 104.3 FM, and Triple J on 101.9 FM.

The city receives five network television stations – Seven (formerly Prime7) (owned by Seven Network), WIN TV (a Nine Network affiliate), Southern Cross 10 (a Network 10 affiliate), ABC TV and SBS.

 Prime7 News produces a half-hour local news bulletin for the Central West, airing each weeknight at 6pm. It is produced from local newsrooms in Orange and Dubbo and broadcast from studios in Canberra.
 WIN Television produces a half-hour local news bulletin for the Central West, airing each weeknight at 5:30pm. It is produced from its local newsroom in Orange and broadcast from studios in Wollongong.
 Southern Cross 10 produces short news updates of 10 News First throughout the day from its Hobart studios.

Subscription television service Foxtel is available in Orange and the surrounding region via satellite.

The local newspapers are the Central Western Daily, The Orange App (online daily news), the Midstate Observer and Orange City Life.

Attractions

Orange has many attractions. There are bush walking trails in Orange including; Spring Glade Walking Track, Cook Park Heritage Walk, Summits Walking Tracks, Nangar National Park and Mullion Range State Conservation Area. Borenore Caves is a series of limestone caves. Duntryleague Golf Club and Clubhouse, Mount Canobolas and Federal Falls in the Mount Canobolas State Conservation Area, Lake Canobolas, Gnoo Blas Motor Racing Circuit, the historic centre of Orange and the Orange Botanic Gardens are also near the town.

Transport

Roads
Orange is situated on the Mitchell Highway, linking the city to Molong, Wellington, Dubbo and Bourke to the north west, and to Bathurst to the east and from there to Sydney via the Great Western Highway. Due west are Parkes and Forbes, which is midway along the Newell Highway, running from Brisbane, Queensland to Melbourne, Victoria. In 2007 a bypass road, known as the northern distributor road, was opened for use after decades of planning.

Public transport
Orange Buslines operate a number of routes within the city and a service to the neighbouring city of Bathurst. Newman's Bus Service operates route two on weekdays to Blayney. Australia Wide Coaches operate a daily coach service to Sydney.

NSW TrainLink operate several coach services with connecting train services from Lithgow to Sydney, as well as a less frequent coach service to Cootamundra for connection to Melbourne.

Air
Orange is also serviced by a regional-class airport, Orange Airport, located approximately 15 km to the south of the city, in an area known as Huntley.

Railways

Orange has two railway stations. The main station, on the Main Western Line to Bourke, was opened in 1877 and is served by the daily NSW TrainLink Central West XPT service between Sydney and Dubbo and the weekly Outback Xplorer service between Sydney and Broken Hill. A smaller station, opened in 1970, known as Orange East Fork, lies on the branch line to Broken Hill was served by the weekly Indian Pacific service to Perth but due to low passenger numbers using this station (16 for the entire year 2017) this "bare bones" station is no longer used and the Indian-Pacific no longer stopping between Mt. Victoria and Broken Hill.

Notable residents

Architecture
 John Andrews AO - internationally acclaimed architect resides in the city
 John Blackwood, 11th Baron Dufferin and Claneboye, is an architect who for most of his career practised in Orange.

Business
 James Dalton (1834–1919), an early Australian merchant, pastoralist, and Roman Catholic lay leader, a key figure in the early development of Orange and district

Film and television
 Billy Bevan (1887–1957), actor, born William Bevan Harris in Orange.
 Mark Furze, a television actor and singer, born in Orange in 1986.
 Elizabeth Lackey, an actress and model, attended Orange High School in the 1980s.

Food and hospitality
 Kate Bracks, winner of the third series of MasterChef Australia, from Orange

Medicine
 Janet Carr, physiotherapist and academic, raised in Orange
 Anna Windsor (born 1976), Multi Olympian and Commonwealth Games swimmer. Medical Doctor based in Orange.

Music and creative arts
 Murray Cook, a vocalist, songwriter and guitarist; best known as one of the members of The Wiggles, grew up in Orange
 Susan, Crown Princess of Albania (1941–2004), the wife of Leka, Crown Prince of Albania, educated and taught art at Presbyterian Ladies' College, Orange
 Shannon Noll, a singer; best known for the song ‘What About Me?’, was born in Orange.

Poetry
 Banjo Paterson (1864–1941), poet, born near Orange
 Kenneth Slessor (1901–1971), poet, born in Orange

Police
 Frederick Hanson (1914–1980), former Commissioner of New South Wales Police, born in Orange

Politics
 Sir Charles Cutler (1918–2006), a former politician including holding office for 28 years as an elected Member for Orange, and former Deputy Premier
 J. J. Dalton (1861–1924), the second son of James Dalton, the first Australian-born member of the British Parliament, born in Orange
 Tim Gartrell, former National Secretary of the Australian Labor Party and now Chief Executive of GenerationOne, born in Orange in 1970
 Sir Neville Howse, VC (1863–1930), the first Australian recipient of the Victoria Cross, a physician living in Orange, twice elected Mayor, and later federal politician

Sports
 Robbie Abel, professional rugby union footballer, born in Orange in 1989
 Jason Belmonte, professional tenpin bowler, born in Orange in 1983
 Edwina Bone, professional hockey player for Australia, was born in Orange
 Darren Britt, former professional rugby league footballer, born in Orange in 1969
 Tino Fa'asuamaleaui, Professional rugby league player, born in Orange in 2000
 Adam Clune, professional rugby league player, born in Orange in 1995
 Andrew Dawes, Australian Paralympic coach, born in Orange in 1969
 Jo Garey, Australian cricketer 1995, lives in Orange.
 Bob Lindfield, professional rugby league player, born in Orange in 1901
 David Lyons, professional rugby union player, born in Orange in 1980
 Phoebe Litchfield, Australian cricketer, lives in Orange.
 James Maloney, professional rugby league player, born in Orange in 1986
 Ted McFadden born in Orange 1880 played in the inaugural Balmain Tigers Rugby League Team (1908–1910)
 Daniel Mortimer, professional rugby league player, born in Orange in 1989
 Peter Mortimer, father of Daniel Mortimer, a former professional rugby league footballer and manager, now news reporter and winery owner, living in the Orange region
 Lucas Parsons, professional golfer, born in Orange in 1969
 Jack Wighton, professional rugby league player, born in Orange in 1993

Heritage listings 
Orange has a number of heritage-listed sites, including:
 215-223 Anson Street: Uniting Church and Kindergarten Hall, Orange
 3-25 Bathurst Road: Bowen Terrace
 84 Byng Street: Union Bank of Australia building, Orange
 Forest Road: Bloomfield Hospital, Orange
 Peisley Street: Orange railway station, New South Wales
 24-26 Summer Street: Cook Park, Orange
 29 Summer Street: Berrilea
 222 Summer Street: Orange Post Office
 Woodward Street: Duntryleague

Water resources

Orange has several water sources used for domestic consumption, both currently in use and formerly used. Currently Suma Park Dam and Spring Creek Reservoir are used for domestic water consumption. Two other dams, Lake Canobolas and Gosling Creek Reservoir, were previously used for domestic water consumption; however, they are now used for recreational purposes. The city is currently on Level 2 water restrictions, following good rain (Sept 2020).  Orange City Council is undertaking a number of strategies to supplement its supply, including stormwater harvesting.

The first batch of harvested stormwater was released into Suma Park Dam on 21 April 2009. The harvested stormwater was tested by Analytical Laboratory Services, an independent laboratory based in Sydney. ALS tested for 90 potential pollutants. The tests revealed that the water quality met all targets. The first batch contained 14 megalitres. It is believed to be an Australian first for harvesting stormwater for potable use. The hardware is in place, operating rules have been developed and environmental factors and impacts on downstream users have been considered. A three-month trial will ensure all these elements are working together to ensure high water quality and environmental standards are met.

There are several phases involved in the commissioning period. The hardware, which includes three separate pumping stations, creek flow monitoring points and advanced electronics including fibre optic cables, will undergo further operating tests. The other elements of the scheme include a weir on Blackmans Swamp Creek, which creates a 3 megalitre pool and the site for the first pump station, a 200 megalitre dam and two 17 megalitre batching ponds. The pumps on the creek transfer stormwater to the 200 megalitre dam at a rate of up to 450 litres per second and are designed to rapidly extract peak storm flows from the creek. The operating rules require that a base flow immediately downstream in the creek must be maintained. The creek flow monitoring points ensure these standards are met. The monitoring station also measures when harvesting can commence. The trigger is flows passing the monitor in Blackmans Swamp Creek exceeding 1000 litres per second.

The local mine, Cadia-Ridgeway Mine, uses the city's treated effluent to supplement its water supply.

Orange is currently planning to implement a pipeline from the Macquarie river to boost the town water supply. This is hotly debated, and researchers believe that it will endanger threatened wetland areas.

Historic buildings 

Anson House
Australia Cinema
Bowen Terrace
Centrepoint Arcade Building
Cook Park Greenhouses and caretakers houses
Dalton Bros Buildings (Myer Building: facade only remains)
Hotel Canobolas (a fine example of Art-Deco style, erected 1939)
Hotel Orange
Holy Trinity Anglican Church
Memorial Hall
Metropolitan Hotel
Orange Court House
Orange Fire Station
Orange Post Office
Orange Public School
Orange Town Hall
Royal Hotel
Saint Joseph's Church
Scout Hall
The former Strand Theatre
Wyoming Court

Historic houses 

Strathroy Manor
Duntryleague House
Kangaroobie Mansion
Croagh Patrick
Woloroi House
Galbally
Killenny
Mena
Ammerdown House
Glenroi House (no longer standing, demolished for McDonald's)

Sister cities
Orange is a sister city to:
 Orange, United States (1963)
 Ushiku, Japan (1990)
 Mount Hagen, Papua New Guinea (1985)
 Timaru, New Zealand (1986)

See also

 List of cities in Australia

References

External links

 Orange City Council

 
1846 establishments in Australia
Populated places established in 1846
Cities in New South Wales
Towns in the Central West (New South Wales)
Central Tablelands
City of Orange
Mining towns in New South Wales
Proposed sites for national capital of Australia